Ferguson House, also known as the Dr. Robert A. Brewer House, is a historic home located at Logansport, Cass County, Indiana. It was erected about 1895, and is a three-story, Romanesque Revival style brick dwelling sheathed in Indiana limestone.  It features projecting bays and a -story round tower with conical roof, a one-story porch supported by Doric order columns, and a steeply pitched roof.

It was listed on the National Register of Historic Places in 1983.

References

Houses on the National Register of Historic Places in Indiana
Romanesque Revival architecture in Indiana
Houses completed in 1895
Houses in Cass County, Indiana
National Register of Historic Places in Cass County, Indiana
Logansport, Indiana